Merveille Lukeba (born 30 March 1990) is a Congo-born British actor, best known for his role as Thomas Tomone in double BAFTA-winning E4 teen drama Skins.

Early life
Born in Kinshasa, Zaire, he was raised in Woolwich, southeast London.

He can speak fluent French and Lingala.

Career

He has played the role of Thomas, a Congolese immigrant to the United Kingdom, in series 3 and 4 of the UK teen drama Skins.

Filmography

References

External links
 
 

1990 births
Living people
People from Kinshasa
Democratic Republic of the Congo emigrants to England
Male actors from London
British male television actors
Black British male actors